"Come Inside" is a song by British pop group Thompson Twins, released in 1991 as the lead single from their eighth studio album Queer. It was written and produced by Alannah Currie and Tom Bailey. The single peaked at No. 56 in the UK and spent four weeks on the chart. The single also peaked at No. 7 on the US Billboard Dance Music/Club Play Singles Chart. The single had a music video filmed to promote it.

The song was featured in a 1991 Beverly Hills 90210 episode.

Background
Speaking of the song's meaning, Bailey told The Advocate in 1991, "It's about a breakthrough between two people, the act of penetration. The song is inspired by William Blake's poem 'The Doors of Deception,' which, as Blake wrote, are hard to open wide. It's amazing how people are not willing to open their minds, but are more than ready to open their legs."

Release
"Come Inside" was initially released in the UK under the moniker 'Feedback Max feat. T.T.' to disguise the identity of the band to club DJs. In a 1991 interview with Kiss FM, Bailey explained the thinking behind hiding the Thompson Twins name on the single:

Critical reception
Upon its release, Billboard described "Come Inside" as a "moody and rhythmic pop confection". They added, "Its reliable knack for crafting clever lyrics and insinuating hooks makes this a good best for attention at top 40, modern rock, and club levels. Tom Bailey's voice has never sounded better." The radio industry trade publication The Network Forty considered the song "catchy" and noted that Thompson Twins "are back and stronger than ever".

Simon Price of Melody Maker felt it showed the Thompson Twins had "gone baggy" which "means a C&C Music Factory remix and lines like 'close your eyes, kiss the sky'". He concluded, "As embarrassing as seeing your parents dancing to House music, as convincing as a Linda McCartney techno-bleep project. Hilarious." Simon Williams of NME wrote, "If Electronic had made 'Come Inside', relatively sane people would indeed be ejaculating forth within the confines of their cotton briefs. Alas, it's only those sad old Thompson Twins getting all dancey."

In a review of Queer, Larry Flick of Billboard stated: "The first single "Come Inside" sets the mood nicely with its slow and sleazy rhythms and sing-along chorus". Ira Robbins of the Trouser Press Record Guide said: "There is a dark, edgy undercurrent to Bailey's singing - like eau de Foetus, diluted to a safe concentration - and in the arrangements of songs like Come Inside, Groove On and The Saint, but the album's general tone is upbeat, atmospheric and clubby."

Formats
7-inch single
"Come Inside (C & C Club Mix Edit)" - 3:20
"Come Inside (Feedback Max House Mix Edit)" - 4:04

12-inch single
"Come Inside (C & C Club Mix Edit)" - 3:20
"Come Inside (Feedback Max House Mix)" - 5:53

12-inch single (US only)
"Come Inside (Turn The Knob Mix)" - 10:10
"Come Inside (Feedback Max Chill Out Remix)" - 6:25
"Come Inside (Feedback Max House Mix)" - 5:51
"The Saint (Def Sonic 12" Mix)" - 7:46
"The Saint (Red Zone Dub)" - 5:32
"The Saint (8th Street Dub)" - 5:32

Double 12-inch gatefold single (US only)
"Come Inside (Turn The Knob Mix)" - 10:10
"Come Inside (Dub Inside)" - 5:00
"Come Inside (Feedback Max Chill Out Remix)" - 6:25
"Come Inside (Rock A Dub)" - 8:04
"Come Inside (Alternative 12" Remix)" - 5:26
"Come Inside (Single Edit)" - 3:58
"Come Inside (Feedback Max House Mix)" - 5:51
"Come Inside (Feedback Max Dub)" - 4:04

CD single
"Come Inside (C+C Club Mix Edit)" - 3:20
"Come Inside (Feedback Max House Mix)" - 5:53
"Come Inside (LP Version)" - 3:57

CD single (US only)
"Come Inside (Single Edit)" - 3:58
"Come Inside (Turn The Knob Mix)" - 10:10
"Come Inside (Feedback Max Chill Out Remix)" - 6:25
"The Saint (Def Sonic 12" Mix)" - 7:46
"The Saint (Red Zone Dub)" - 5:32
"Come Inside (Feedback Max House Mix)" - 5:51
"Come Inside (Turn The Knob Edit)" - 3:57

CD single (US promo)
"Come Inside" - 4:00

Personnel 
 Editor – George Morel, Ricky Crespo
 Recording Engineer, Mixer – Lloyd Puckitt
 Additional Producer – Feedback Max, George Morel, Ricky Crespo
 Assistant Producer – Keith Fernley
 Producer, Writer, Vocals – Alannah Currie, Tom Bailey
 Design – Graham Wood, John Warwicker
 Recording Engineer, Mixer – John Poppo
 Photography – Mike Owen
 Additional Producer, Remixer – David Morales

Charts

References

1991 songs
1991 singles
Thompson Twins songs
Songs written by Alannah Currie
Songs written by Tom Bailey (musician)
Warner Records singles